Kiryandongo Refugee Settlement is a refugee camp in Bweyale in Kiryandongo district Uganda.

It is a home for refugees from Burundi, DR Congo, Rwanda, Kenya and South Sudan.

Population 
As of October 2021, the camp, Kiryandongo Refugee Settlement, hosted over 73780 refugees. The settlement is dominated by refugees from South Sudan.

History
The Kiryandongo area was first used for resettling refugees in 1954  when the British colonial administration asked the Bunyoro Native Government to give the Colonial Government of the Governor to move Kenyan refugees fleeing the Mau Mau Uprising to Kigumba in what was then Masindi District. The Bunyoro Native Government gave land to the Governor for the period of 49 years. During the Idi Amin administration, the land was part of a large-scale government ranching scheme, of which reminders remain today in the names of the subdivisions of the camp. This left the land sparsely populated.

In 1990 the Ugandan government gazetted the virtually uninhabited land around Kiryandongo for refugee resettlement. Ethnic Acholi people fleeing the Sudan People's Liberation Army from Parjok in South Sudan were settled in Kiryandongo after temporarily being held in Kitgum and Masindi. During the 1990s the Sudanese refugees were joined by Ugandan Acholi IDPs from the LRA-affected areas of Gulu and Kitgum.

Kiryandongo also served as an interim stop for displaced people transiting to other camps, including 22,000 who moved from the Achol-Pii Refugee Settlement to Kyangwali in 2002.

Social services 
The Youth Peacemaker Network provides youth programs to more than 65,000 refugees at Kiryandongo. It is a collaboration with the Western Union Foundation.

Health care and sanitation 
As part of the United Nations High Commissioner for Refugees, Kiryandongo provides basic necessities to over 100,000 refugees.

References

Refugee camps in Uganda
Kiryandongo District